Sungan (also romanized as Sūngān) is city
Qaleh Rural District, in the Central District of Manujan County, Kerman Province, Iran. At the 2006 census, its population was 28, in 4 families.

References 

Populated places in Manujan County